Gazeta 55 is an Albanian language newspaper published in Tirana, Albania. The newspaper is a politically unaffiliated daily, with nine reporters on staff records. The tabloid's owner is Fahri Balliu, an Albanian businessman.

History and profile
Gazeta 55 was first published on 18 October 1997.

At the beginning of the 2000s Gazeta 55 had a circulation of 4,500 copies.

Name
The number "55" was chosen because Article 55 of the Constitution of communist Albania, dealt with Agitation and Propaganda related crimes.

Content

Sections
The newspaper is organised in three sections, including the magazine.
 News: Includes International, National, Tirana, Politics, Business, Technology, Science, Health, Sports, Education.
 Opinion: Includes Editorials, Op-Eds and Letters to the Editor.
 Features: Includes Arts, Movies, Theatre, and a Sigurimi file (mainly about the communist era)

Web presence
Gazeta 55 has had a web presence since 2008. Accessing articles requires no registration, and the whole newspaper is available in PDF. The online editor is Leonard Quku.

See also
 List of newspapers in Albania
 News in Albania

References

External links
Official website 

1997 establishments in Albania
Newspapers established in 1997
Newspapers published in Albania
Albanian-language newspapers
Albanian news websites
Mass media in Tirana